Anastasios "Tasos" Papanastasiou (born 12 July 1964) is a Greek former water polo player who competed in the 1984 Summer Olympics, in the 1988 Summer Olympics, in the 1992 Summer Olympics, and in the 1996 Summer Olympics.

See also
 Greece men's Olympic water polo team records and statistics
 List of players who have appeared in multiple men's Olympic water polo tournaments

References

External links
 

1964 births
Living people
Greek male water polo players
Olympic water polo players of Greece
Panathinaikos Water Polo Club players
Water polo players at the 1984 Summer Olympics
Water polo players at the 1988 Summer Olympics
Water polo players at the 1992 Summer Olympics
Water polo players at the 1996 Summer Olympics